The Farmers and Merchants Bank is a historic commercial building on Main Street, facing the courthouse square, in Mountain View, Arkansas.  It is a two-story stone structure, with a flat roof obscured by a parapet. Built out of rusticated stone, it has vernacular Romanesque styling in its rounded window and door openings on the first floor, and its crenellations at the top of the parapet.  It was built in 1910, during the city's first major period of stone construction, by Bill Laroe, who also built the Stone County Courthouse.

The building was listed on the National Register of Historic Places in 1985.

See also
National Register of Historic Places listings in Stone County, Arkansas

References

Bank buildings on the National Register of Historic Places in Arkansas
Romanesque Revival architecture in Arkansas
Commercial buildings completed in 1910
Buildings and structures in Mountain View, Arkansas
National Register of Historic Places in Stone County, Arkansas